Skin Two is a fetish magazine covering aspects of the worldwide fetish subculture. The name is a reference to fetish clothing as a "second skin".

History and profile
Skin Two was founded in 1983 by the publisher Tim Woodward and the photographer Grace Lau.

Published in London, Britain and circulated throughout the globe, Skin Two magazine provides information about fetish fashion, events, parties, people and news. A major concentration of the magazine is latex and other fetish clothing and the people and events related to the wearing of this clothing and alternative fashion in general. There is also a lot of information and features on fetishism and BDSM in general. The German version of the magazine, Skin Two Germany, was started by Peter Czernich in 1987. It was closed in 1989.

The magazine has also provided a stepping stone to further success for several internationally known writers, fetish models and photographers. Notable names featured in Skin Two include Tim Burton, Jean-Paul Gaultier, Dita Von Teese and Katy Perry.

Skin Two magazine is still published by Tim Woodward's company KFS Media, which has recently launched a sister periodical called KFS Magazine, covering the wider range of alternative sexuality as a whole.

Skin Two Clothing
Skin Two is also a clothing and accessories label, which is currently manufactured and sold by UK-based fetishwear company Honour Ltd under licence of KFS Media. As of 2022, Honour has re-branded itself as Skin Two.

Skin Two Rubber Ball
The magazine hosts this ball for fetish-related wear and people into fetishism and BDSM in general. It's the central event in a weekend of fetish parties, held in London annually.

References

External links 
 KFS Media's website
 SkinTwo.co.uk
 Honour's website
 Audio interview with Tim Woodward on The Fetish Show
Arco Pleasure's Website 
 RubberLoft.com

Pornographic magazines published in the United Kingdom
Fetish magazines
Fetish clothing manufacturers
Magazines established in 1983
Magazines published in London